Eternal Emperor is Crimson Moonlight's first EP. It was released in 1998 and introduced a more polished output that focuses on keyboard-driven symphonic black metal. The EP would often be compared to many similar symphonic black metal groups at the time, especially Dimmu Borgir.

Track listing
"Intro-Preludium" - 02:01
"Where Darkness Cannot Reach" - 03:30
"Symphony of Moonlight" - 02:19
"Eternal Emperor" - 04:31
"The Final Battle" - 05:40

References

Crimson Moonlight albums
1998 EPs